São João da Paraúna is a municipality in western Goiás state, Brazil.

Location
São João is located west of Goiânia, 36 km. north of Paraúna.
Highway connections from Goiânia:  state highway BR-069 west from Goiânia, through Trindade, Santa Bárbara de Goiás, Firminópolis, and then GO-164 for 32 kilometers south.

Neighboring municipalities:  Aurilândia, Paraúna, Palminópolis, Jandaia, Acreúna.(Firminopolis),(São Luis dos Montes Belos)

Political information
Mayor: Claudivino Ferreira da Silva (January 2005)
City council: 09 members
Eligible voters: 1,687 (December/2007)

Demographic information
Population density: 5.56 inhabitants/km2 (2007)
Urban population: 1,212 (2007)
Rural population: 487 (2007)
Population growth: a gain of about 300 people since 1980

Economic information
The economy is based on subsistence agriculture, cattle raising, services, public administration, and small transformation industries.
Industrial units: 1 (2007)
Commercial units: 17 (2007)
Dairy: Laticínios MB Ltda (22/05/2006)
Motor vehicles: 200  (2007), which gave a ratio of 8.5 inhabitants for each motor vehicle.  (motorcycles and motorbikes not counted)
Cattle herd: 30,500 head (5,190 milk cows) (2006)
Main crops (2006): cotton, rice, beans, manioc, corn (1,340 hectares), and soybeans (2,900 hectares).
Data are from Sepin

Education (2006)
Schools: 2
Students: 453
Higher education: none
Adult literacy rate: 87.1% (2000) (national average was 86.4%)

Health (2003)
Hospitals: 0
Hospital beds: 0
Ambulatory clinics: 2
Infant mortality rate: 13.70 (2000) (national average was 33.0)

Municipal Human Development Index
Life expectancy:  73.5
School attendance rate:  0.837
MHDI:  0.779
State ranking:  34 (out of 242 municipalities in 2000)
National ranking:  1,093 (out of 5,507 municipalities in 2000)

Data are from 2000

For the complete list see Frigoletto.com

See also
List of municipalities in Goiás

References

Frigoletto

Municipalities in Goiás